Hillman State Park is a  Pennsylvania state park in Hanover Township, Washington County in the United States. The park opened in the late 1960s and has been managed for hunting by the Pennsylvania Game Commission since the early 1980s. The park also has hiking, cross-country skiing, horseback riding, a radio-controlled aircraft field, and mountain bike trails that are open to the public. The largely undeveloped park is north of U.S. Route 22 and east of Pennsylvania Route 18 in northern Washington County near the village of Bavington and the borough of Burgettstown. Part of the park has been designated as Pennsylvania State Game Lands 117.

Hillman State Park lies within the Appalachian mixed mesophytic forests ecoregion. The park is a wild area that connects the Kings Creek and Raccoon Creek watersheds within the greater Raccoon Creek Valley Natural Area.

Nearby state parks
The following state parks are within  of Hillman State Park:
Beaver Creek State Park (Ohio)
Point State Park (Allegheny County)
Raccoon Creek State Park (Beaver County)
Tomlinson Run State Park (West Virginia)

References

External links

  

Parks in the Pittsburgh metropolitan area
State parks of Pennsylvania
Protected areas established in 1969
Parks in Washington County, Pennsylvania
Protected areas of Washington County, Pennsylvania
1969 establishments in Pennsylvania